The women's heptathlon event at the 1989 Summer Universiade was held at the Wedaustadion in Duisburg on 28 and 29 August 1989.

Results

References

Athletics at the 1989 Summer Universiade
1989